Nå skruva fiolen (Now screw the violin) is Epistle No. 2 in the Swedish poet and performer Carl Michael Bellman's 1790 song collection, Fredman's Epistles. The epistle is subtitled "Till fader Berg, rörande fiolen" (To father Berg, about the violin). It is both about and mimicking the rhythm of playing the violin. The scholar Lars Lönnroth comments that Bellman used the resemblance of a cello to a woman's body, certainly pretending to play it as such for laughs, while the use of words like "screw" in the lyrics was similarly explicitly obscene. The Bellman interpreter Fred Åkerström recorded the song on his 1974 album Glimmande nymf.

Background

Epistle

Music and verse form 

The song has three stanzas, each of 17 lines, with a cello interlude before the 15th line. It is in  time, marked Andante. The rhyming pattern is ABBBC-ADDDC-ECEC-FFC.

The source of the melody is unknown, but a variant is printed in Bellmans Poetiska Arbeten with the timbre Marche. The musicologist James Massengale comments that the melody printed there does not fit the rhythm of the text on the third and fourth lines, so it may be closer to the source than Bellman's adaptation of the tune.

Lyrics  

The song was written between July and September 1770, making it one of the early epistles. The composition is subtitled "Till fader Berg, rörande fiolen" (To father Berg, about the violin). The lyrics portray and mimic the rhythm of playing the violin. Bellman's biographer Paul Britten Austin notes that where epistle No. 3 ("Fader Berg i hornet stöter") perfectly captures the sound of a horn with its minuet melody, No. 2's melody "is exactly a fiddler's", as "no hornist could conveniently play this tune". He remarks how different the two are "in style, tempo, rhythm, even instrumental tone-colour". Epistle No. 2 uses "swift flitting words" like "Kära Syster, hej!" to suggest the bowing of the violin, while the song begins with the "Vivaldi-like upbeat" of "Nå!", in his view placing the listener instantly on the dance-floor.

Reception and legacy 

Lars Lönnroth writes that Bellman had the cello play the role of Ulla Winblad's body; contemporary instruments, and indeed his own cittern, were topped by a small carved head of a woman, above the tuning pegs. On the intervention of the cello in each stanza, marked "V:cllo" in the text, he states that Bellman certainly pretended to play the instrument, lewdly gliding his hands up and down its body and making everyone laugh. He puns on "skruva" ("screw", a tuning peg in the head of a stringed instrument, and the verb for "to screw") also in Epistle 7, Fram med basfiolen, knäpp och skruva, "Som synes vara en elegi, skriven vid Ulla Winblad's säng, sent om en afton" (Which seems to be an elegy, written by Ulla Winblad's bed, late one evening). Its opening lines are "Fram med basfiolen, knäpp och skruva, V:cllo --- skjut skruven in; pip och kuttra som en turturduva V:cllo --- för makan sin" (Out with the bass viol, pluck and screw, Cello --- push the screw in; twitter and coo like a turtle dove Cello --- for his wife). Lönnroth comments that the ambiguity about the instrument here turns to explicit obscenity.

The Epistle was recorded live in Stockholm's concert hall by Cornelis Vreeswijk, Fred Åkerström and Ann-Louise Hanson as the first track of their 1964 folk music album Visor och oförskämdheter. Åkerström also recorded the song on his 1974 studio album Glimmande Nymf, where it formed the first track. His guitar and vocals were accompanied in his group's arrangement by Katarina Fritzén on flute and vocals, and Örjan Larsson on cello; the recording omits the last stanza. It was recorded, too, by Bosse Forssell on his 1999 album Porträtt av Bellman. The Epistle is sung in English by the tenor Torsten Mossberg, accompanied by Jonas Isaksson on guitar and Andreas Nyberg on violin, on the 2020 classical album Är jag född så vill jag leva/Am I Born, Then I'll Be Living.

Notes

References

Sources

 
 
 
  (contains the most popular Epistles and Songs, in Swedish, with sheet music)
  (with facsimiles of sheet music from first editions in 1790, 1791)

External links 

 Text of Epistle 2 on Bellman.net
 Epistle 2 performed by Lars Winnerbäck (provided by the artist), on YouTube
 1959 performance by Sven-Bertil Taube with Stockholm's Baroque Ensemble and Stockholm's Philharmonia Orchestra (provided by Parlophone Sweden), on YouTube
 Live 2020 studio recording of 'Bellman 2.0' theatre concert (song starts at 11:46) at Västmanlands Teater by Nikolaj Cederholm and Kåre Bjerkø with their band, on YouTube

Fredmans epistlar
18th-century songs